Phylolestes is a monotypic genus of damselflies in the family Synlestidae. It contains the single species Phylolestes ethelae, the Hispaniolan malachite. It is endemic to the island of Hispaniola, where it occurs in both the Dominican Republic and Haiti.

This species has been noted at only three locations. It inhabits streamsides in forested mountain habitat around 2000 meters in elevation. The larvae develop in cold, clear pools. It is threatened by the destruction of its habitat.

References

Insects described in 1948

Endemic fauna of Hispaniola
Synlestidae
Taxonomy articles created by Polbot